Gaspar Cassadó i Moreu (30 September or 5 October 1897 – 24 December 1966) was a Spanish  cellist and composer of the early 20th century. He was born in Barcelona to a church musician father, Joaquim Cassadó, and began taking cello lessons at age seven. When he was nine, he played in a recital where Pablo Casals was in the audience; Casals immediately offered to teach him. The city of Barcelona awarded him a scholarship so that he could study with Casals in Paris.

He was also the author of several notable musical hoaxes, notably the "Toccata" that he attributed to Girolamo Frescobaldi.

The personal papers of Cassadó's father are preserved in the Biblioteca de Catalunya. Gaspar's own papers, along with those of his wife, the pianist , are preserved at the Tamagawa University Museum of Education.

On the invitation of his great friend Alicia de Larrocha, with whom he had a cello-piano duo (touring extensively with him from 1956–58), Gaspar Cassado played concerts and led frequent classes at Academia Marshall in Barcelona. The Professor of Cello chair at Academia Marshall is named after Gaspar Cassado and held since 2018 by Professor Jacob Shaw.

Compositions

Original works
Cassadó's many transcriptions are listed below his original works.

Concertos
Cello Concerto in D minor (1926)
This piece, like the Suite for Cello Solo, is influenced by Spanish and Oriental folk music, and Impressionism. Cassadó studied composition with Maurice Ravel, and a Ravel-influenced "carnival music" appears in the second theme of the first movement. The second movement is a theme and variations which leads directly to a pentatonic Rondo.

Solo cello works
Suite for Cello Solo
The Suite, like the Cello Concerto and the Piano Trio, came from one Cassadó's most prolific periods, in the mid-1920s. It consists of three dance movements: Preludio-Fantasia (a Zarabanda); Sardana; and Intermezzo e Danza Finale (a Jota). The first movement includes quotations from Zoltán Kodály's Sonata for Cello Solo, Op. 8, and the famous flute solo from Maurice Ravel's ballet Daphnis et Chloé. The sardana of the second movement is a traditional dance from Catalonia. 
Fugue in the Style of Handel

Solo guitar works
Canción de Leonardo
Catalanesca
Dos Cantos Populares Finlandeses (Two Finnish Folk Songs)
Leyenda Catalana
Préambulo y Sardana
Sardana Chigiana

Works for cello and piano
Allegretto Grazioso "After Schubert"
Archares 1954
Danse du diable vert (Dance of the Green Devil) for violin or cello 1926
La Pendule, la Fileuse et le Galant 1925
Lamento de Boabdil 1931
Minuetto "After Paderewski"
Morgenlied 1957
Partita 1935
Pastorale "After Couperin"
Rapsodia del Sur
Requiebros 1934

Serenade 1925
Sonata in A minor 1925
Sonata nello stile antico spagnuolo (Sonata in an "Old Spanish Style") 1925
Toccata "After Frescobaldi" 1925

Chamber works
Piano Trio in C major 1926/1929
String Quartet No. 1 in F minor 1929
String Quartet No. 2 in G major 1930
String Quartet No. 3 in C minor 1933

Transcriptions

Concerto transcriptions
Cello Concerto in F major, based on Carl Philipp Emanuel Bach's Concerto No. 3 in A major, Wq. 172
Cello Concerto in D major, based on Mozart's Horn Concerto No. 3 in E flat major, K. 447
Cello Concerto in A minor, based on Schubert's Arpeggione Sonata, D. 821
Cello Concerto in E major, based on Tchaikovsky's Piano Pieces, Op. 72 (1940)
Cassadó transformed nine of Tchaikovsky's pieces into a concerto. He used No. 18 Scene dansante (Invitation au trepak), No. 3 Tendres Reproches and No. 14 Chant Elegiaque in the first movement; No. 5 Meditation and No. 8 Dialogue in the second and No. 4 Danse Caracteristique, No. 2 Berceuse, No. 17 Passe Lointain and No. 1 Impromptu in the third. This concerto was a favorite of Cassadó's. It was published in 1940 by Edition Schott No. 3743.
Cello Concerto in D major, based on Weber's Clarinet Concerto No. 2 in E-flat major, Op. 74
Cello Concerto in E minor, based on Vivaldi's Cello Sonata No. 5, RV. 40
Guitar Concerto in E major, based on Boccherini's Concerto No. 2 in D major, G. 479
Cassadó completely rewrote the Concerto for his colleague Andrés Segovia. The transcription features a solo string quartet, and trumpet fanfares make it reminiscent of Rodrigo.

Transcriptions for solo cello
Johann Sebastian Bach - Cello Suite No. 4, BWV 1010
Cassadó transposed the suite to F major from its original key of E-flat major.
Frédéric Chopin - Étude, Op. 25, No. 1
George Frideric Handel - The Harmonious Blacksmith (from the Harpsichord Suites Vol.1 No.5 "Air and Variations")

Transcriptions for cello and piano
Isaac Albéniz:
 Cádiz (Serenata española)
Malagueña, Op. 165, No. 3
Martin Berteau - Studio
Luigi Boccherini - Minuetto
Alexander Borodin - Serenata all spagnola (from String Quartet B-La-F)
Jean-Baptiste Bréval - Sonata in G major (realization of figured bass)
Frédéric Chopin - Minute Waltz, Op. 64, No. 1
Constantino de Crescenzo - Prima Carezza
Claude Debussy:
Clair de lune
Golliwog's Cakewalk
Minstrels
Antonín Dvořák - Sonatina in G major, Op. 100 (Indian Lament)
Gabriel Fauré - Nocturne No. 4
Enrique Granados - Intermezzo (from the opera Goyescas)
Ernesto Halffter - Canzone e Pastorella
Blas de Laserna - Tonadilla
Franz Liszt - Liebestraum (Notturno) No. 3
Benedetto Marcello:
Sonata No. 1 in C major
Sonata No. 4 in A minor
Federico Mompou - Chanson et Danse
Federico Moreno Torroba - Fandanguillo
Wolfgang Amadeus Mozart:
Rondo alla turca (from Piano Sonata K.331)
Serenata de Don Giovanni [Deh vieni alla finestra]
Sonata K. 358 (from Sonata for Piano Four Hands)
Georg Muffat - Arioso
Ignacy Jan Paderewski - Minuet in G
Manuel Ponce - Estrellita (Little Star)
David Popper - Elfentanz
Johann Strauss II - An der schonen Blauen Donau

References

Further reading
 Gaspar Cassadó: Cellist, Composer and Transcriber, Gabrielle Kaufman, Routledge, London (2017),

External links
Brief biography from the International Cello Society
Nathaniel J. Chaitkin's doctoral thesis on Gaspar Cassadó: His Relationship with Pablo Casals and His Versatile Musical Life (2001)
His Profile at The Remington Site
Personal papers Joaquim Cassadó in the Biblioteca de Catalunya

1897 births
1966 deaths
Spanish classical cellists
Catalan classical cellists
Spanish music educators
Spanish classical composers
Spanish male classical composers
20th-century classical composers
Musicians from Barcelona
20th-century Spanish musicians
20th-century Spanish male musicians
20th-century cellists